In violation of the Geneva Protocol of 1925, the Iraqi Army initiated two failed (1970–1974, 1974–1978) and one successful (1978–1991) offensive chemical weapons (CW) programs. President Saddam Hussein (1937–2006) pursued the most extensive chemical program during the Iran–Iraq War (1980–1988), when he waged chemical warfare against his foe. He also used chemicals in 1988 in the Al-Anfal Campaign against his civilian Kurdish population and during a popular uprising in the south in 1991.

Although efforts to acquire chemical weapons dated back to the early 1960s (pre-dating Hussein's regime), the Iraqis did not have stockpiles at the outbreak of the war with Iran in 1980. But in time, they began to develop an intensive research program to produce and store chemical weapons and used the war fields to test and perfect their chemical warfare prowess. Thus, as the war continued, Iraq's chemical warfare program expanded rapidly.

According to Iraq, while the majority of its mustard gas was of 90–95% purity, it struggled to consistently produce nerve agents of high purity. The average purity of its tabun was 50–60%; production of it was abandoned in 1986 in favor of concentrating on sarin. The average quality of sarin and related products was in the range of 45–60%—sufficient for battlefield use in the Iran–Iraq War, but not for long-term storage. Efforts after the Iran–Iraq War to develop VX were relatively unsuccessful, with purity of 18–41% considered insufficient for weaponization.

Iraq's biological warfare development pursued a similar course, but by the time Iraqis were testing biological warheads (containing anthrax and botulinum toxin) in Iraq's deserts, the war had come to an end.

Production

Early history: the 1970s

The 1980s program

On September 22, 1980, Iraq staged an all-out war on Iran from ground, air, and sea and came to occupy a vast part of Iranian territory. But in the following months it was evident that the Iranian nation was determined to reclaim its occupied territories. Contrary to the Iraqis' conception, the continued occupation of Iran required more effective weapons.

Saddam Hussein's chemical warfare development and use can be divided into three phases:
 Phase 1: January 1981 to June 1983, Iraq started testing chemical weapons.
 Phase 2: August 1983 to December 1983, chemical weapons were used to a limited extent.
 Phase 3: February 1984 to the end of the war, chemical weapons were used extensively.

Project 922 was the codename for Iraq's third and most successful attempt at producing chemical and biological weapons. Within three years (1978–1981), Project 922 had gone from concept to production for first generation Iraqi chemical weapons (mustard agent). By 1984, Iraq started producing its first nerve agents, Tabun and Sarin. In 1986, a five-year plan was drawn up that ultimately led to biological weapons production. By 1988, Iraq had produced VX. The program reached its zenith in the late 1980s during the Iran–Iraq War. From August 1983 to July 1988 Iran was subjected to extensive Iraqi chemical attacks. Between 1981 and 1991, Iraq produced over 3,857 tons of CW agents.

As part of Project 922, German firms  helped build Iraqi chemical weapons facilities such as laboratories, bunkers, an administrative building, and first production buildings in the early 1980s under the cover of a pesticide plant.  Other German firms sent 1,027 tons of precursors of mustard gas, sarin, tabun, and tear gasses in all. This work allowed Iraq to produce 150 tons of mustard agent and 60 tons of Tabun in 1983 and 1984 respectively, continuing throughout the decade. All told, 52% of Iraq's international chemical weapon equipment was of German origin. One of the contributions was a £14m chlorine plant known as "Falluja 2", built by Uhde Ltd, then a UK subsidiary of German chemical company Hoechst AG; the plant was given financial guarantees by the UK's Export Credits Guarantee Department despite official UK recognition of a "strong possibility" the plant would be used to make mustard gas. The guarantees led to UK government payment of £300,000 to Uhde in 1990 after completion of the plant was interrupted by the first Gulf War. In 1994 and 1996 three people were convicted in Germany of export offenses.

Use

Iran–Iraq War

On September 22, 1980, Iraq launched an invasion against Iran, marking the beginning of the eight-year Iran–Iraq War. The Iraqi army, trained and influenced by Soviet advisors, had organic chemical warfare units and a wide variety of delivery systems. Neither side achieved dominance and the war quickly became a stalemate. To stop the human-wave–attack tactics of the Iranians, the Iraqis employed their home-produced chemical agents as a defensive measure against the much-less–prepared Iranian infantry. The first reported use of chemical weapons occurred in November 1980.

Throughout the next several years, additional reports of chemical attacks circulated, and by November 1983, Iran notified the UN that Iraq was using chemical weapons against its troops. After Iran sent chemical casualties to several Western nations for treatment, the UN dispatched a team of specialists to the area in 1984, and again in 1986 and 1987, to verify the claims. The conclusion from all three trips was the same: Iraq was using chemical weapons against Iranian troops and civilians. In addition, the second mission stressed that Iraq's use of chemical weapons appeared to be increasing. The reports indicated that mustard gas and tabun were the primary agents used and that they were generally delivered in bombs dropped by an airplane. The third mission (the only one allowed to enter Iraq) also reported the use of artillery shells and chemical rockets and the use of chemical weapons against civilian personnel.

In the letter of transmittal to the UN after the conclusion of the third mission, the investigators pointed out the dangers of this chemical warfare:

It is vital to realize that the continued use of chemical weapons in the present conflict increases the risk of their use in future conflicts. In view of this, and as individuals who witnessed first hand the terrible effects of chemical weapons, we again make a special plea to you to try to do everything in your power to stop the use of such weapons in the Iran–Iraq conflict and thus ensure that they are not used in future conflicts. ... In our view, only concerted efforts at the political level can be effective in ensuring that all the signatories of the Geneva Protocol of 1925 abide by their obligations. Otherwise, if the Protocol is irreparably weakened after 60 years of general international respect, this may lead, in the future, to the world facing the specter of the threat of biological weapons.

Declassified documents later revealed that the United States was both aware of Iraq's use of chemical weapons, and also facilitated its acquisition of chemical and biological precursors which were used to make weapons.

Another analyst insisted that "In a sense, a taboo has been broken, thus making it easier for future combatants to find justification for chemical warfare, this aspect of the Iran–Iraq War should cause Western military planners the gravest concern." The Iran–Iraq War failed to reach a military conclusion despite Iraq's use of chemical weapons. Roughly 5% of the Iranian casualties were caused by chemical weapons. The toll may surpass 90,000 though, according to Iranian experts, since the latency period is as long as 40 years. In August 1988, Iran finally accepted a UN ceasefire plan. One of the factors that led to this decision was the fear of chemical attacks against Iranian civilians, since Saddam had used them against civilians in the past and that caused "no major international outcry".

Persian Gulf War
During the Persian Gulf War of 1991, under orders by Saddam Hussein, large numbers of missiles were fired on Israel and Saudi Arabia. Besides causing many deaths and extensive property damage, it was feared that the missiles could be armed with nerve gas leading the Israeli and Saudi governments to distribute gas masks to all their citizens.

Shortly after the fighting between Iraq and Coalition Forces in the Gulf War came to a cease-fire in February 1991, reports circulated that Saddam Hussein was using chemical agents against Kurds and Shiite Muslims, near UN troops. The United States intercepted a message ordering the use of chemical weapons against the cities of Najaf and Karbala. U.S. President George H. W. Bush's response was that such use of chemical weapons would result in air strikes against the Iraqi military organization using the chemicals.

List of known Iraqi CW uses
The Iran–Iraq War ended in August 1988. By that time, according to the Iraq Survey Group Final Report, seven UN specialist missions had documented repeated use of chemicals in the war. According to Iraq itself, it consumed almost 19,500 chemical bombs, over 54,000 chemical artillery shells and 27,000 short-range chemical rockets between 1983 and 1988. Iraq declared it consumed about 1,800 tons of mustard gas, 140 tons of Tabun, and over 600 tons of Sarin. Almost two-thirds of the CW weapons were used in the last 18 months of the war.

Examples of CW use by Iraq include the following from the Final Report. (These are selected uses only. Numerous other smaller scale CW attacks occurred.)

Use in the Iran–Iraq War, 1983–1988

Use at Halabja, Iraq 1988

On March 16, 1988, the Halabja massacre occurred. The Iraqi army hit residential areas of the Iraqi city with sarin gas and the roads leading out of the city with mustard gas the day after. An estimated 3,200 to 5,000 people were killed. Most of the victims were Kurdish Iraqi civilians who died within minutes after the bombing and those who survived and tried to leave the city the following day were injured when they passed contaminated roads. 

In the meanwhile, an Iraqi high-ranking authority officially confessed in a meeting with Javier Pérez de Cuéllar, the Secretary-General of the United Nations for the utilization of chemical weapons by Iraq.

Use in Southern Iraq against the Popular Uprising, 1991
 March 1991: an-Najaf – Karbala area – Nerve agent & CS, Shi'a casualties not known.

See also
 Alleged British use of chemical weapons in Mesopotamia in 1920
 Chemical Weapons Convention#Iraqi stockpile
 Iraqi biological weapons program
 Iraq and weapons of mass destruction
 Iraq chemical attacks against Iran
 Various articles listed in :Category:Foreign relations during the Iran–Iraq War
 The Dark Pictures Anthology: House of Ashes

References

 
Iran–Iraq War crimes
Weapons of Iraq
Military of Iraq